Tanga Cement Public Limited Company is a cement manufacturing company in Tanzania. Its shares of stock are listed on the Dar es Salaam Stock Exchange, where they trade under the symbol TCCL.

Location
The company maintains corporate offices at Coco Plaza, 254 Toure Drive, Oysterbay, in Dar es Salaam, the commercial and financial capital of Tanzania.

Overview
Tanga Cement Plc is a large cement manufacturers, whose annual production capacity is over 1.25 million tonnes of cement. As of 30 June 2019, the company had total assets of TSh 435.94 billion (approx. US$191 million), with shareholders' equity of TSh 140.85 billion (approx. US$62 million). Tanga Cement Plc produces Simba branded portland cement grades of Type II 32.5R and Type II 42.5R.

History
The company was founded in 1980 by the Tanzanian government. It was inaugurated by Tanzania's founder-president, Julius Nyerere in 1981. In 1989, the parastatal, then known as Tanga Cement Company Limited entered into a management contract with Holcim Cement of Switzerland. In 1996, the government of Tanzania sold 60 percent shareholding in the company to Holcim Cement, the management company of the business.

In 2002, the company's shares of stock were listed on the Dar es Salaam Stock Exchange. The government of Tanzania divested from the business and Holcim increased their ownership to 62.5 percent. Holcim went through several name changes, including Holcim Mauritius and eventually AfriSam Mauritius.

Ownership
Tanga Cement Plc's stock is listed on the Dar es Salaam Stock Exchange; its symbol is TCCL. The table below illustrates the shareholding in the stock of the company, as at 31 December 2016.

See also
 Cement in Africa
 Twiga Cement
 Dangote Industries Tanzania
 Nyati Cement

References

External links
Tanga Cement Website

Companies listed on the Dar es Salaam Stock Exchange
Companies of Tanzania
Tanga, Tanzania
Economy of Dar es Salaam
Companies established in 1980
1980 establishments in Tanzania
Cement companies of Tanzania
Tanzanian brands